Siccia tau is a moth of the family Erebidae first described by Franciscus J. M. Heylaerts in 1891. It is found in India, Java, and Sri Lanka.

References

Moths of Asia
Moths described in 1891